Consul Strotthoff is a 1954 West German romantic drama film directed by Erich Engel and starring Willy Birgel, Inge Egger, and Carl Wery. It is also known by the alternative title of Melody Beyond Love.

The film's sets were designed by the art directors Emil Hasler and Walter Kutz.

Synopsis
In Salzburg a love triangle develops around a pretty music student working as a tour guide.

Cast

References

Bibliography

External links 
 

1954 films
1954 romantic drama films
German romantic drama films
West German films
1950s German-language films
Films directed by Erich Engel
Films set in Salzburg
Films set in Hamburg
German black-and-white films
1950s German films